Halfway Tree is the second album by Jamaican reggae artist Damian "Jr. Gong" Marley. The name "Halfway Tree" comes from his mother, Cindy Breakspeare, being from the rich part of town, and his father, Bob Marley, coming from the poor part of town, thus him being "a tree halfway in between the 'rich' world and 'poor' world." Additionally, Halfway Tree is a well-known landmark that marks the cultural center of Half-Way-Tree, the clock tower that stands where the historical eponymous cotton tree once stood is featured prominently behind Marley on the cover of the album. The album was released on September 11, 2001 and received the 2002 Grammy Award for Best Reggae Album. It was co-produced by Damian Marley and his brother Stephen Marley. There is a hidden track on the end of "Stand a Chance" at  – 5:08. It is called "And You Be Loved".

Chart performance
The album debuted at number 2 on the Billboard Reggae Albums, and sold 2,000 copies, during its first week of release in the United States. As of September 21, 2005,  Halfway Tree has sold 91,000 recognized copies in the United States.

Track listing
"Educated Fools" (featuring Bounty Killer and Treach from Naughty by Nature and spoken introduction from Bunny Wailer) and Kidnyce (Musician)
"More Justice"
"It Was Written" (featuring Stephen Marley, Capleton and Drag-On)
"Catch a Fire" (featuring Stephen Marley)
"Still Searchin'" (featuring Stephen Marley and Yami Bolo)
"She Needs My Love" (featuring Yami Bolo and Sabor)
"Mi Blenda"
"Where Is the Love" (featuring Eve)
"Harder" (Interlude)
"Born to be Wild"
"Give Dem Some Way" (featuring Daddigan)
"Half Way Tree" (Interlude)
"Paradise Child" (featuring Mr. Cheeks and Jimmy Cozier)
"Stuck in Between"
"Half Way Tree" 
"Stand a Chance" (featuring Yami Bolo and Treach)

Charts

External links

References

2001 albums
Damian Marley albums
Motown albums
Albums produced by Swizz Beatz
Grammy Award for Best Reggae Album